Many human rights groups criticised civilian casualties resulting from military actions of NATO forces in Operation Allied Force. Both Serbs and Albanians were killed in 90 Human Rights Watch-confirmed incidents in which civilians died as a result of NATO bombing. It reported that as few as 489 and as many as 528 Yugoslav civilians were killed in the NATO airstrikes. Kenneth Roth, the executive director of Human Rights Watch, criticized NATO's decision to bomb civilian infrastructure in the war. "Once it made the decision to attack Yugoslavia, NATO should have done more to protect civilians," Roth remarked. "All too often, NATO targeting subjected the civilian population to unacceptable risks". Yugoslav government estimated that no fewer than 1,200 civilians and up to 2,500 civilians were killed and 5,000 wounded as a result of NATO airstrikes.

From the beginning of Operation Allied Force, NATO pledged to minimise civilian casualties. Consideration of civilian casualties was incorporated into NATO's planning and targeting process. Targets were "looked at in terms of their military significance in relation to the collateral damage or the unintended consequence that might be there", according to General Henry Shelton, Chairman of the Joint Chiefs of Staff. Critics of the campaign have suggested that incidents were the inevitable result of NATO's policy of restricting its pilots to bombing from 15,000 feet or above for the sake of avoiding NATO deaths.

Incidents

March 30, 1999: Bombing of Čačak
On March 30, 1999, during a two-day air raid on the Sloboda munitions plant in Čačak, Mileva Kuveljić was killed in her home outside of the factory from airstrikes. According to a local historian, Goran Davidović, another person injured by that day's airstrikes died a month later.

April 1–2, 1999: Airstrikes in Novi Sad, Orahovac
On April 1, 1999 at 5:05 am local time, the Varadin Bridge in Novi Sad was destroyed by NATO projectiles, killing a 29-year old NIS refinery worker Oleg Nasov. The following day, 11 civilians were killed after the village of Nogovac in Orahovac was struck by three missiles.

April 4–6, 1999: Bombings in Belgrade, Pančevo, Aleksinac, and Vranje
On April 4, 1999, three workers were killed when the oil refinery in Pančevo was hit by NATO airstrikes. Subsequently, 80,000 tons of oil ignited into flames, and the concentration of carcinogens over Pančevo rose 10,500 times higher than local laws allowed at the time. On the same day, one civilian was killed after airstrikes struck electric heating plants in Belgrade.

On April 5, 1999, a neighborhood in Vranje was bombed, killing two civilians and injuring 15. On the night of April 5–6, 1999, 12 civilians were killed in the southern mining town of Aleksinac after it was struck by NATO forces. A total of 35 homes and 125 apartment units were destroyed, with no obvious military target in the vicinity according to the Serbian newspaper Politika.

April 12, 1999: Bombing in southern Serbia

On April 12, 1999, NATO airstrikes struck a railway bridge in Grdelica, hitting a passenger train on the Niš - Preševo line. According to Večernje Novosti, 15 of the killed civilians were identified, a large number of passengers were classified as "missing". The Leskovac city board forbade medical workers and doctors to give information to journalists on collected remains of killed civilians, preventing a more complete record of civilian casualties from taking place. Human Rights Watch listed the names of 12 passengers killed in Grdelica, although reported that 20 civilians were killed in total. Yugoslavia's Tanjug reported about 50 passengers killed, whereas the Belgrade government recorded 55. In a commemorative gathering held on April 12, 2017, Miodrag Poledica, Serbia's Minister of Construction, Transport, and Infrastructure, asserted that "the exact number of those killed was never determined, but it's assumed that there were more than fifty."

In a separate bombing on the same day, six civilians were killed in Merdare from NATO airstrikes on the border of Kuršumlija and Podujevo.

April 14, 1999: First bombing of a refugee column

On April 14, during daylight hours, NATO aircraft repeatedly bombed Albanian refugee movements over a twelve-mile (19 km) stretch of road between Gjakova and Dečani in western Kosovo, killing seventy-three civilians and injuring thirty-six others Human Rights Watch (HRW) could document. The attack began at 1:29 and persisted for about two hours, causing civilian deaths in numerous locations on the convoy route near the villages of Bistrazin, Gradis, Madanaj, and Meja.

April 21, 1999: Second bombing of refugee camp
On April 21, 1999, a Serbian refugee camp in Majino Naselje of Gjakova was struck by heavy airstrikes. The Los Angeles Times reported that four civilians were killed, however a Belgrade-based bulletin listed the names of five individuals who were killed in the attack. NATO spokesman Mike Phillips denied that NATO was responsible for the bombing of Majino Naselje.

April 23, 1999: Radio Television Serbia (RTS) headquarters bombing 

One of the largest incidents of civilian deaths, and certainly the largest in Belgrade, was the bombing of state TV headquarters in Belgrade on April 23. As a consequence, sixteen RTS civilian technicians and workers were killed and sixteen were wounded. Dragoljub Milanovic was the director general of Serbian Radio and Television and belonged to former Yugoslav leader Slobodan Milosevic's Socialist Party of Serbia. He was found guilty and jailed for 10 years for intentional withholding information from his employees about the eventual bombing, which had a direct effect on the number of dead.

April 27, 1999: First bombing of Surdulica 
On April 27, 1999, NATO missiles struck several houses in the southern town of Surdulica. A CNN journalist named Alessio Vinci subsequently visited the local morgue, where he reported 16 civilians killed as a result of the attack. One of Serbia's public broadcasters, RTS, reported that 20 civilians were killed in Surdulica on April 27, 1999. Many of the victims had been killed in a single house on Zmaj Jova street, owned by Vojislav Milić. Milić's family and several neighbors took refuge in Milić's basement when his house was struck by two bombs, after which nine people were killed in his house alone.

April 29–May 1, 1999: Bombings in Montenegro and Kosovo

On April 29, 1999, one woman was killed and three more people were injured from shrapnel during the bombing of Tuzi. On April 30, 1999, NATO bombs struck Murino, a village located near Plav, killing six civilians of whom three were under the age of 16.

On May 1, 1999, a Niš-Ekspres bus taking passengers to Kosovo was hit by NATO missiles when it crossed a bridge in the village of Lužane near Podujevo. The number of casualties reported from the Niš-Ekspres bombing vary, with Human Rights Watch recording 39 civilians killed whereas the Minister of Health Leposava Milićević reported that 47 civilians killed in the bus bombing had been identified.

In a separate attack, also on May 1, 1999, at least 12 civilians were killed when a Romani neighborhood in Prizren was struck by NATO bombs.

May 4, 1999: Bus bombing in Savine Vode
On May 4, 1999, a bus was destroyed in the village of Savine Vode near Peć, with 17 civilian deaths. NATO denied responsibility, however a remnant of a bomb found in Savine Vode after the attack had the markings of Magnavox, an American electronics manufacturer. The Yugoslav government submitted further evidence to Human Rights Watch, after which Human Rights Watch counted the casualties as those inflicted by NATO.

May 7, 1999

Cluster bombing of Niš

On May 7, 1999, cluster munitions were dropped on Niš. Human Rights Watch recorded 14 civilians killed whereas Serbian sources reported 16 civilians killed.

Chinese embassy bombing

A salvo of US JDAM GPS-guided bombs struck the embassy of the People's Republic of China in Belgrade, killing three Chinese diplomats and injuring 20 others. CIA director George Tenet later admitted in congressional testimony that the CIA had organised the strike and that it was the only strike of the campaign organised by his agency, though he still claimed it was accidental. China has never accepted the US explanation for the incident.

May 14, 1999: Bombing of Koriša 

Starting before midnight and lasting into the morning hours of May 14, 1999, NATO planes bombed the village of Koriša in Kosovo, where Albanian peasants were seeking refuge in a convoy. Sources vary between 77 and 87 killed.<ref name="Balt">{{cite web|url=http://articles.baltimoresun.com/1999-06-20/news/9906220504_1_refugees-yugoslavia-korisa|newspaper=The Baltimore Sun|author=Will Englund|title=Refugees call Korisa a setup|date=June 20, 1999|access-date=July 4, 2012}}</ref> Survivors of the attack claimed that they had been set up by the Yugoslav police, who led them to the supply depot which was bombed that night. The Yugoslav police had led the refugees to the depot promising them refuge and passage to Albania, although the survivors claimed that the police asked for money and made threats before escorting them. After the bombing of Koriša, Yugoslav troops took TV crews to the scene shortly after the bombing. The Yugoslav government insisted that NATO had targeted civilians.

May 19–21, 1999: Bombings in Dedinje, Gnjilane, and the Dubrava prison massacre
Gnjilane
At approximately 10:20 am local time on May 19, 1999, a small industrial area in Gnjilane was struck by NATO airstrikes, immediately killing three women who were working at the agricultural firm "Mladost". A man working for "Binačka Morava" initially survived the airstrikes, but died of his injuries the same day. Glas javnosti published the names of all four workers killed in Gnjilane that day.

Dragiša Mišović hospital bombing
At approximately 12:50 am local time on May 19, 1999, the University Hospital Center Dr Dragiša Mišović in Belgrade was destroyed by NATO laser-guided bombs. RTS listed the names of three patients killed. Seven soldiers of the Yugoslav Army were also killed in the hospital, although their names were listed separately from those of the three patients. NATO admitted that a missile was aimed at barracks in the Dedinje district, which is close to the hospital, went astray.

Dubrava prison massacre

Starting on May 19, 1999, NATO forces bombed the town of Istok, killing three prisoners and a prison guard that day. Two days later, NATO forces struck the prison complex again, with at least 19 prisoners being killed from the airstrikes, according to Human Rights Watch. Subsequent to the lethal airstrikes, special units from the Yugoslavia's Ministry of Internal Affairs along with various criminals selected by the special forces carried out a false flag operation, during which the prisoners were massacred by firearms, after which state agency Tanjug claimed that all of the prison victims were killed by the airstrikes.

 May 29–31, 1999: Morava region, Novi Pazar, and road bombings

On May 29, 1999, the Prizren-Brezovica road was subject to NATO airstrikes. A chauffeur was killed driving in a convoy of journalists, and three more were injured. At 1:05 pm local time on the following day, 1999, 10 civilians were killed when NATO bombers mounted a daylight raid on a bridge over the Great Morava river in Varvarin. The streets and bridge had more people than usual as Trinity Sunday was observed that day. NATO spokesman Jamie Shea said the alliance had bombed a "legitimate designated military target".

Surdulica was bombed for the second time on the night of May 30–31, 1999, when NATO airstrikes destroyed a sanatorium and a retirement home. Human Rights Watch published the names of the 23 civilians killed in the sanatorium.

On May 31, 1999, a residential building was struck by a NATO bomb in Novi Pazar, killing 11 civilians. On the same day, Human Rights Watch recorded that airstrikes killed three civilians in three separated incidents throughout central and southern Serbia; in Vranje, on the "Raška bridge", and in Draževac.

 Human Rights Watch analysis 

Human Rights Watch documented and evaluated the impact and effects of the NATO military operation, and confirmed 90 incidents in which civilians died as a result of NATO bombing. These included attacks where cluster bombs were dropped. In 1999, it was estimated that 488–527 Yugoslav civilians died as a result of NATO bombing. The report also criticized Pentagon and NATO officials for a lack of attention to the issue of civilian deaths, suggesting "a resistance to acknowledging the actual civilian effects and an indifference to evaluating their causes."

 NATO strategy and claims 
From the very beginning of Operation Allied Force, minimizing civilian casualties was a major declared NATO concern. According to NATO, consideration of civilian casualties was fully incorporated into the planning and targeting process. All targets were "looked at in terms of their military significance in relation to the collateral damage or the unintended consequence that might be there," General Shelton said on April 14: "Then every precaution is made...so that collateral damage is avoided." According to Lt. Gen. Michael Short, "collateral damage drove us to an extraordinary degree...[and] committed hours of [my] day dealing with the allies on issues of collateral damage." "There is always a cost to defeat an evil," said NATO spokesman Jamie Shea, "It never comes free, unfortunately. But the cost of failure to defeat a great evil is far higher." He insisted NATO planes had bombed only "legitimate designated military targets," and if more civilians had died it was because NATO had been forced into military action. He then defended this notion by stating, "NATO does not attack civilian targets, we attack exclusively military targets and take every precaution to avoid inflicting harm on civilians."

 See also 
Casualty recording
Humanitarian Law Centre
Civilian casualties during the NATO intervention in Libya

Notes
 Zmaj Jova street is named after Jovan Jovanović Zmaj. Serbian variations of nouns are such that the street is spelled as "Zmaj Jove" (as opposed to having an "a" letter at the end) in the context of the sentence in the OK Radio'' article on the Milić family from Surdulica.
 There are multiple villages in the former Yugoslavia named Lužane. The Lužane bus bombing took place in a village called Lužane by Podujevo in Kosovo. However, there is another village also called Lužane located near Aleksinac, although that is not where the Niš-Ekspres bus was bombed.

References

Sources

External links 
NATO's bombing blunders (BBC)
Civilian Deaths in the NATO Air Campaign - The Crisis in Kosovo (HRW)
List Of Incidents Involving Civilian Deaths in Operation Allied Force (HRW)
SELECT CHRONOLOGY OF NATO ATTACKS, MARCH 24-MAY 7, 1999 (HRW)

Kosovo War

Serbian war casualties
Serbia–United States relations
 
Incidents involving NATO
People killed during the NATO bombing of Yugoslavia